THP may refer to:

Chemistry and biochemistry
 Tamm–Horsfall protein (also known as uromodulin), a glycoprotein found in urine
 Tetrahydropalmatine, a plant alkaloid
 Tetrahydroprogesterone, any of four stereoisomer neurosteroid metabolites of progesterone with the word pregnanolone
 Tetrahydropyran, an organic chemical
 THP-1 cell line, a human cell line derived from a leukemia patient used in  immunocytochemical analysis
 tris(hydroxypropyl)phosphine

Medicine
 Trihexyphenidyl, an antiparkinsonian agent

Other
 Tan Hiep Phat Beverage Group, a Vietnamese drink producer
 Tennessee Highway Patrol, a law enforcement agency in the US
 Texas Highway Patrol, a law enforcement agency in the US
 The Hunger Project, an American non-profit organization working to end food shortages around the world
 Thermal hydrolysis process, a sewage treatment method
 THP Orchestra, a 1970s Canadian disco band
 Tomlinson-Harashima precoding, a version of dirty paper coding, a mathematical technique to reduce the impact of interference in digital communications
 Trembling-hand perfection or trembling hand perfect equilibrium, a concept in game theory
 Turbo High Pressure, a variant of the Prince engine developed by BMW and PSA Peugeot Citroën

References